Little Coon Lake is a lake in Anoka County, Minnesota, in the United States.

Little Coon Lake was named for the abundant raccoons seen there by early settlers.

See also
List of lakes in Minnesota

References

Lakes of Minnesota
Lakes of Anoka County, Minnesota